Sabang Merauke Raya Air Charter (SMAC) was an airline based in Medan, North Sumatra, Indonesia. It operated scheduled and charter domestic/regional passenger and cargo services, as well as pleasure and business flights. Its main base was Polonia International Airport, Medan. SMAC was listed in category 2 by Indonesian Civil Aviation Authority for airline safety quality. The airline went defunct in 2011.

History 

The airline started operating in 1969 as a joint venture partnership with Malaysian Air Charter (MAC). In 1972, it split from MAC and adopted the name Sabang Merauke Raya Air Charter (SMAC), which would remain its official name until the company ceased to exist. SMAC was fully owned by Merukh Enterprises.

In 2011, the Indonesian Directorate General of Civil Aviation (DGAC) suspended SMAC's air operating certificate (AOC) due to the fatal accident of a CASA NC-212 on Bintan Island. The plane crashed during a test flight, and all five passengers on board died. 

A preliminary investigation into the accident found that: 
The pilot in command was not qualified for that type of flight. 
No permission was obtained to carry out a test flight. 
A spare engine was carried on board during the flight.

The airline ended operations that same year.

Fleet

As of August 2006, the Sabang Merauke Raya Air Charter fleet included:

2 Indonesian Aerospace NC-212-100 (one crashed)

As of January 2005, the airline had also operated:

1 de Havilland Canada DHC-6 Twin Otter Series 300
1 Britten-Norman BN-2A Islander
Piper PA-23 Aztec
Piper PA-31 Navajo

Destination
 Buol – Pogogul Airport
 Makassar – Sultan Hasanuddin International Airport
 Palu – Mutiara SIS Al-Jufrie Airport
 Selayar – H. Aroeppala Airport
 Toli Toli – Sultan Bantilan Airport

Incidents
 On November 30, 2006, IPTN NC-212 PK-ZAI crashed on landing; no injuries or deaths were reported.
 On February 12, 2011, five people were killed when a CASA NC-212 Aviocar, belonging to SMAC, crashed on Bintan Island, Indonesia during a test flight.

References 

Defunct airlines of Indonesia
Airlines established in 1972
Merpati Nusantara Airlines
Airlines disestablished in 2011
 Indonesian companies established in 1969
 Airlines established in 1969
Indonesian companies established in 1972